Ban Pak Phli station is a railway station located in Pak Phli Subdistrict, Pak Phli District, Nakhon Nayok Province. It is the de facto railway station of Nakhon Nayok Province, despite being located almost at the border of the province almost twenty kilometres from Nakhon Nayok Town. The other railway station in Nakhon Nayok is Ongkharak railway station on the Phra Phutthachai freight line.

References 

Railway stations in Thailand
Nakhon Nayok province